Tun Seri Setia Dr. Haji Mohd. Ali bin Mohd. Rustam (born 24 August 1949) is a Malaysian politician who has served as the 7th Yang di-Pertua Negeri of Malacca since June 2020. He served as the 9th Chief Minister of Melaka from December 1999 to May 2013, Deputy Minister of Health from November 1996 to December 1999, Deputy Minister of Transport from May 1995 to November 1996, Member of Parliament (MP) for Batu Berendam from April 1995 to November 1999, Member of the Malacca State Legislative Assembly (MLA) for Bukit Batu from March 2004 to May 2013, Paya Rumput from November 1999 to March 2004, Sungai Udang from October 1990 to April 1995 and Ayer Molek from August 1986 to October 1990. He is a member of the United Malays National Organisation (UMNO), a component party of ruling Barisan Nasional (BN) coalition.

Early life and education 
Mohd Ali was born in Kampung Bukit Katil, Malacca on 24 August 1949. He got his first education at Sekolah Kebangsaan Bukit Katil and Sekolah Kebangsaan Semabok and continued his secondary education at Malacca High School. He got his tertiary education with Bachelor of Degree of Social Science at Universiti Sains Malaysia (USM).

Political career 
Mohd Ali joined UMNO in 1968 and became its vice-president from 2004 to 2009. He has been an elected representative in Malacca since 1986 and became Chief Minister on 3 December 1999 for fourteen years.

He was a member of the Dewan Rakyat for Batu Berendam from 1995 to 1999 and tried to contest in Bukit Katil (later Hang Tuah Jaya) in 2013 and 2018 general elections but lost both to Shamsul Iskandar Md Akin from People's Justice Party.

Mohd Ali is also president of the Malaysian Silat Federation (PESAKA), Malaysian Karate Federation and of Dunia Melayu Dunia Islam.

Chief Minister of Malacca (1999-2013) 
Malacca became a fully developed state in 2010 under the leadership of Mohd Ali. This news came after Malacca fulfilled 32 indicators of development specified by Organization for Economic Cooperation and Development. Other contributions done by Mohd Ali include Melaka River Cruise, Melaka Straits Mosque and Taming Sari Tower.

Yang di-Pertua Negeri of Malacca (since 2020) 
Mohd Ali entered the office the Yang di-Pertua Negeri of Malacca on 5 June 2020 replacing Mohd Khalil Yaakob who ended his sixteen-year tenure as the Yang di-Pertua Negeri of Malacca. He is the first native Malaccan held the highest post.

Election results

Honours

Honours of Malaysia 
  :
  Commander of the Order of Loyalty to the Crown of Malaysia (PSM) – Tan Sri (2014)
  Grand Commander of the Order of the Defender of the Realm (SMN) – Tun (2020)
  :
  Knight Grand Commander of the Order of the Territorial Crown (SUMW) – Datuk Seri Utama (2021)
  :
 Community Service Medal (PBM) (1982)
  Companion Class I of the Exalted Order of Malacca (DMSM) – Datuk (1989)
  Knight Commander of the Exalted Order of Malacca (DCSM) – Datuk Wira (1995)
  Grand Commander of the Exalted Order of Malacca (DGSM) – Datuk Seri (2001)
  Grand Master of the Premier and Exalted Order of Malacca (DUNM) – Datuk Seri Utama (2020)
  Grand Master and Knight Grand Commander of the Premier and Faithful Exalted Order of Malacca (SPSM) – Seri Setia (2020)
  :
  Grand Commander of the Order of Kinabalu (SPDK) – Datuk Seri Panglima (2005)
  :
  Knight Grand Commander of the Order of the Defender of State (DUPN) – Dato' Seri Utama (2021)

Honorary degrees 
  :
 Honorary Ph.D. degree from Universiti Teknikal Malaysia Melaka (2003)
 Honorary Ph.D. degree in Management from Multimedia University (2011)

References 

Living people
1949 births
People from Malacca
Malaysian people of Malay descent
Malaysian Muslims
United Malays National Organisation politicians
Yang di-Pertua Negeri of Malacca
Chief Ministers of Malacca
Members of the Malacca State Legislative Assembly
Malacca state executive councillors
Members of the Dewan Rakyat
Members of the Dewan Negara
Commanders of the Order of Loyalty to the Crown of Malaysia
Grand Commanders of the Order of the Defender of the Realm
Grand Commanders of the Order of Kinabalu
Universiti Sains Malaysia alumni
21st-century Malaysian politicians